Pink Cadillac  may refer to:

 Pink Cadillac (film), a 1989 film starring Clint Eastwood
 "Pink Cadillac" (song), a 1984 song by Bruce Springsteen
 Pink Cadillac (album), a 1979 album by John Prine
 Elvis' Pink Cadillac, the singer's 1955 Cadillac Fleetwood 60 automobile
 Mary Kay Pink Cadillac, a gift by the Mary Kay cosmetics company for its top sellers
 A pink Cadillac